Jerusalem, named for the Biblical Jerusalem (in Māori, Hiruhārama), is a settlement  up the Whanganui River from Whanganui, New Zealand. Originally called Patiarero, it was one of the largest settlements on the Whanganui River in the 1840s, with several hundred Ngāti Hau inhabitants of the iwi Te Āti Haunui-a-Pāpārangi. Unlike other Whanganui River settlements given transliterated place names by Reverend Richard Taylor in the 1850s, Jerusalem is usually referred to using the English version of its name. It grew into several small settlements, including Roma (named for Rome) and Peterehama (named for Bethlehem), founded by the remains of Taylor's congregation after the majority converted to Catholicism when a Roman Catholic mission was built in 1854.

Jerusalem was the isolated site where, in 1892, Suzanne Aubert (better known as Mother Mary Joseph) established the congregation of the Sisters of Compassion. They became a highly respected charitable nursing/religious order. A convent remains on the mission property, as well as the church which replaced the original building destroyed by fire in 1888, and Sisters of Compassion still care for them. Wiremu Te Āwhitu was the priest at the church from 1968 to 1989.

New Zealand poet James K. Baxter and many of his followers formed a community at Jerusalem in 1970, which disbanded in 1972 after Baxter's death. Baxter is buried there.

There are two Ngāti Hau marae grounds in Jerusalem: Hiruhārama or Patiarero Marae and Whiritaunoka meeting house, and Peterehema Marae and Upokotauaki meeting house.

Demographics

There were 429 households. There were 597 males and 555 females, giving a sex ratio of 1.08 males per female. The median age was 42.5 years (compared with 37.4 years nationally), with 246 people (21.3%) aged under 15 years, 189 (16.4%) aged 15 to 29, 540 (46.8%) aged 30 to 64, and 180 (15.6%) aged 65 or older.

Ethnicities were 73.2% European/Pākehā, 40.5% Māori, 2.9% Pacific peoples, 0.5% Asian, and 0.8% other ethnicities (totals add to more than 100% since people could identify with multiple ethnicities).

The proportion of people born overseas was 6.5%, compared with 27.1% nationally.

Although some people objected to giving their religion, 46.8% had no religion, 40.0% were Christian, 0.3% were Buddhist and 4.9% had other religions.

Of those at least 15 years old, 126 (13.9%) people had a bachelor or higher degree, and 198 (21.8%) people had no formal qualifications. The median income was $25,000, compared with $31,800 nationally. The employment status of those at least 15 was that 453 (49.8%) people were employed full-time, 171 (18.8%) were part-time, and 39 (4.3%) were unemployed.

Jerusalem Foundling Home 

From 1891 the Jerusalem settlement took in some abandoned children from around New Zealand, the majority of whom had unmarried or widowed parents and were sometimes anonymously sent to the convent. In 1896 the Jerusalem Foundling Home was formally established.

Children of school age went to the settlement school run by the Sisters of Compassion, which was also attended by children from the local marae. Unable to attain classification as an Industrial School (which would allow the Home to receive Government funding for the orphaned children), from 1891 to 1895 children were placed on the roll of Industrial Schools in Nelson and Upper Hutt but remained at the convent.

From 1885 the Jerusalem settlement began taking in newborn babies. This came at a time when there was widespread publicity about and condemnation of baby farming, in particular, the case of Minnie Dean. Against legislation and popular opinion at the time, Suzanne Aubert as leader of the Jerusalem Foundling Home believed firmly that the anonymity of parents was essential to ensuring the safety of both them and their children. The register of children kept at the Home did not publicly list the names of parents, although Aubert herself kept a private register with parental information in case parents wished to reconnect with their children later in life. However, this meant the Home was ineligible for state funding at the time, due to ignoring legislation which required registers to list the names of parents and submit these to Government inspection.

In 1898 an inquest took place into the death of seven babies at the Home, with doctors at the time concluding that the cause of death was either measles or unsterilised cows milk. During this inquest, the Home was criticised for its secrecy around Government inspection.

Notable people 
 Suzanne Aubert established a religious community at Jerusalem in 1892

 Earl Bamber (born 1990), racing driver, learned to drive at Jerusalem

 James K. Baxter, poet and playwright, established a community at Jerusalem in 1970 (without his wife, Jacquie Sturm) and was later buried there

 Wiremu Te Āwhitu (28 July 1914 – 29 July 1994), the first Māori to be ordained a Roman Catholic priest, lived at Jerusalem from 1968 till 1989

References

External links

Sisters of Compassion Jerusalem website

Populated places in Manawatū-Whanganui
Whanganui River
Settlements on the Whanganui River
Whanganui District